The second season of the Philippine television reality competition show, The Clash was broadcast by GMA Network. Regine Velasquez did not return to be the host due to her shifting commitments to GMA's rival network, ABS-CBN. She was replaced by Rayver Cruz and Julie Anne San Jose. Ken Chan and Rita Daniela took over as the co-hosts, replacing Andre Paras and Joyce Pring.

It premiered on September 21, 2019, on the network's Sabado Star Power and Sunday Grande line up replacing StarStruck. The season ended with 26 episodes on December 15, 2019, having Jeremiah Tiangco as the winner.

Auditions

Auditions took place in the following cities in the Philippines:

The segment Duet with Me from the Philippine variety show Studio 7 features battles against two singers performing a duet with an artist. The winner will automatically advance to the top 64 preliminary round of The Clash.

Top 64
Originally, the 12 winners of Duet with Me, a segment of the musical variety show Studio 7, automatically advances to the first round after Remy Luntayao and Krezia Mae Toñaco withdrew from the competition before the final auditions of the remaining top 52 clashers selected by vocal coach Jai Sabas-Aracama; songwriter, music producer, and South Border lead vocalist Jay Durias; and TV director Bert de Leon. Jeniffer Maravilla and Pamela Quidol, who both battled and lost to Luntayao and Toñaco respectively, are brought back by the show to replace them and join the Top 64.

The 64 clashers were electronically paired to battle it out in a singing duel with the winner advancing to the next round. A wild card round was announced in the tenth episode after the judges chose to eliminate the selected clasher and its opponent during their battle in Round 2. The judges selects two of the temporarily eliminated clashers from round two to compete for the sixteenth seat for the third round.

Color key

	
  Winner
  Runner-up 
  Finalists
  Eliminated in the Fourth Round
  Eliminated in the Third Round
  Eliminated in the Second Round
  Eliminated in the First Round
 Italicized names are the winners of the Duet with Me challenge
 Underlined name was the clasher who won the Wild Card round.

aFor the first time in the show's history, Nicole Apolinar and Mark Mendoza, who battled in Round 2, have not advanced after the judges couldn't decide between the two of them before eliminating both Apolinar and Mendoza as a result.bAntonette Tismo was reinstated in the competition after beating out Janina Gonzales, who defeated her previously on the third week, in The Clash Back on December 8, 2019.

Round 1: One on One

The randomizer electronically select the clashers that will face each other in the clash arena. After their performance, the clash panel selects who will advance to the next round. They need to get at least majority of the panels votes.

Color key

Episode 1 (September 21)

The episode opens with an intro of the Clash Masters Rayver Cruz and Julie Anne San Jose and Journey Hosts Ken Chan and Rita Daniela singing The Clash themesong "Mangarap Ka, Laban Pa" by Quest. It then transitions with an opening performance of The Greatest Showman's "This Is Me" by the top 64 clashers with season 1 winner Golden Cañedo, The Clash Panelists Christian Bautista,  Ai-Ai delas Alas and Lani Misalucha, and the hosts.

Episode hashtag: #GMATheFirstClash

Episode 2 (September 22)

Episode hashtag: #GMATheClash2019

Episode 3 (September 28)

Episode hashtag: #GMATHECLASHRoundOne

Episode 4 (September 29)

Episode hashtag: #GMATopOfTHECLASH

Episode 5 (October 5)

Episode hashtag: #GMATHECLASHParaSaPangarap

Episode 6 (October 6)

Episode hashtag: #GMATHECLASHBattleTo32

Episode 7 (October 12)

Episode hashtag: #THECLASHAgawanUpuan

Episode 8 (October 13)

Episode hashtag: #THECLASHHulingSabak

Round 2: Laban Kung Laban
Like the first season, the randomizer electronically select one clasher that will choose his/her opponent per round. The selected clashers corresponding to the color of their seats (black or white) will challenge their opponent according to the opposite color.

Meanwhile, the chosen opponent decides who to sing first. After their performance, the clash panel selects who will advance to the next round and will stay on top of the clash. They need to get at least majority of the panel's votes. The second season introduces the "Clasher Save" where the singer who are challenged to fight will be given an option to have his/her team save him/her from the battle. The advantage will be used once in each team before the clasher was selected for the second time.

Color key

Episode 9 (October 19)
The theme of this challenge performed by the 32 clashers is to sing OPM Music hits in Round 2.

Episode hashtag: #THECLASHLabanKungLaban

Non-competition performance: Top 32 clashers with Julie Anne San Jose, Rita Daniela and season 1 alumni Jong Madaliday and Garrett Bolden singing Michael Jackson's "Black or White".

Episode 10 (October 20)
In the previous episode, Clash panelist Ai-Ai delas Alas was selected by the randomizer for an advantage on the second day of Round 2: she will select one of the remaining 32 clashers to compete first.

Episode hashtag: #THECLASHBlackVSWhite

1The clasher was selected by delas Alas as the advantage in Round 2.2Neither of the Clash panelists cannot decide between Apolinar and Mendoza to determine who won the challenge and as a result, both clashers did not advance and were eliminated from the competition. From the guidelines of the show, if the judges decided to eliminate the two contestants in the round, a wild card was announced until the end of Round 2.

Episode 11 (October 26)

Sassa Dagdag was selected by the randomizer last week for the advantage where she'll be the recipient for her team's clasher save. She receives immunity from the second round and decides to choose the clasher from both team to compete first.

Episode hashtag: #THECLASHLabanOSave

1The clasher was selected by Dagdag as the advantage in Round 2.

Episode 12 (October 27)
At the end of Round 2, the wild card contending pair battled for the last seat remaining of the 16-seat semi-finalists group of competitors.

Episode hashtag: #THECLASHHulingHamon

Wild card 
The wild card clashers, a pair of two, were selected by the judges among the losers in the second round. The chosen pair were Nef Medina from episode 11 and Princess Vire from episode 10.

1The clasher was selected by the host.

Round 3: Pares Kontra Pares
On this round, the clashers are paired. Marlon Ejeda was selected by the randomizer to move the three clashers in his team to fill in the spots for the Black Team. The randomizer then select one clasher that will choose his/her partner from the opposite team for a duet while the selected partner each take turns to compose the pairs. Below is the groupings selection. Italicized names are those electronically selected.

For each set, a pair will be chosen electronically that will choose their opponent pair. After the performance, the clash panel will vote for a pair that will advance on the next round. For the losing pair, they will compete on each other in Matira ang Matibay round and only one will remain, still subject for the votes of the clash panel. This season introduces the "Clash" or "Pass" advantage where the challenged pair will either proceed or opt the opppent pair's challenge for one battle but if the pair choose the latter option, they will automatically competete against another pair selected by the randomizer in the next battle.

Color key

Episode 13 (November 2)
Episode hashtag: #THECLASHParesKontraPares

Non-competition performance: Shawn Mendes and Camila Cabello's "Señorita" and Bazzi's "Beautiful" by Rayver Cruz, Julie Anne San Jose, Ken Chan and Rita Daniela

Episode 14 (November 3)
Episode hashtag: #THECLASHKakampiOKalaban

Non-competition performance: Jessie J, Ariana Grande and Nicki Minaj's "Bang Bang" by Ai-Ai delas Alas and XOXO

Episode 15 (November 9)

After using the pass in the previous episode, Lorraine Galvez and Marlon Ejeda are challenged by default to compete against the opponent pair selected by the randomizer.

Episode hashtag: #THECLASHRedChairs

Non-competition performance: R. Kelly's "I Believe I Can Fly" by Lani Misalucha, Aicelle Santos and 4th Impact

1The clasher was selected by the host.

Episode 16 (November 10)
Episode hashtag: #THECLASHFinalDuet

Non-competition performance: "Hindi Tayo Pwede" by Christian Bautista and The Juans

1The pair was selected by the host.

Round 4: Isa Laban sa Lahat
This is the final round of the competition. Every week, after the performances, the judges will select their top clashers (number depends on every episode) who will stay on the competition while the bottom two clashers will face-off on Matira ang Matibay round on which one clasher will be safe while the other will be eliminated.

Color key

Top 12
The randomizer selects Tombi Romulo who will pick a set six of clashers that will perform on the episode while she joins with the remaining five clashers to perform on Sunday. Each clasher will pick an envelope to determine their order.

Episode 17 (November 16)
Episode hashtag: #THECLASHIsaLabanSaLahat

Non-competition performance: Smokey Mountain's "Paraiso" and "Better World" by season 1 winner Golden Cañedo and the Top 12 Clashers

Matira ang Matibay

Episode 18 (November 17)
Episode hashtag: #THECLASHTopTen

Matira ang Matibay

Top 10
The randomizer selects two clashers (Janina Gonzales and Aljon Guttierrez) to take turns picking their sets of clashers before switching their places to the opposite groups. The selected clasher will select the next clasher to perform next.

Episode 19 (November 23)
Episode hashtag: #THECLASHDangerTen

Non-competition performance: Clean Bandit and Zara Larsson's "Symphony" by Top 10 Clashers and Lani Misalucha

Matira ang Matibay

Episode 20 (November 24)
Episode hashtag: #THECLASHMatiraWalo

Non-competition performance: "Sa'Yo" and "Pasensya Ka Na" by Rayver Cruz, Julie Anne San Jose and Silent Sanctuary

Matira ang Matibay

Top 8
The randomizer selects a clasher. The remaining clashers will then have ten seconds to stand if they wish to challenge the chosen clasher. If no one stands, the chosen clasher will decide who to compete against.

Episode 21 (November 30)
Episode hashtag: #THECLASHBagongPagsubok

Non-competition performance: "Go Up" by SB19 and Blackpink's "Ddu-Du Ddu-Du" by Ai-Ai delas Alas and SB19

Matira ang Matibay

Episode 22 (December 1)
Episode hashtag: #THECLASHTumayoAngMatapang

Non-competition performance: "Another Silent Christmas Song" by Jessica Sanchez and Christian Bautista and Mariah Carey's "All I Want for Christmas Is You" by Sanchez, Bautista and the Top 7 Clashers

1All three remaining clashers stood which returned the choice to Janina.

Matira ang Matibay

Top 6
The six remaining clashers are responsible in picking the order of performance by draw lots.

The bottom two clashers are announced and there is no Matira ang Matibay clash on this round instead the bottom clasher will battle the wildcard clasher on the next episode.

Episode 23 (December 7)
Episode hashtag: #THECLASHPasabog

Non-competition performance: Bon Jovi's "Livin' on a Prayer" by Top 6 Clashers and Dennis Trillo

The Clash Back
Six clashers who were eliminated on Round 4 has the chance to return to the competition by being a wildcard and the clasher who advanced competes against Janina Gonzales on the Matira ang Matibay clash.

The safe clashers, who reprise their previous performances, are responsible in picking the order of wildcard performance by draw lots.

Episode 24 (December 8)
Episode hashtag: #THECLASHBack

Matira ang Matibay

Final Top 6

Episode 25 (December 14)
Clashers each performed concert-type medleys of songs. The order was determined by a pre-episode draw.

Episode hashtag: #THECLASHConcert

Non-competition performance: "Unbreakable" by Lani Misalucha

The Final Clash 2019
The Clashers perform in a pre-determined order. Only two clashers will advance to the Ultimate Final Clash to determine the grand champion of this season.

Episode 26 (December 15)
Episode hashtag: #TheFinalClash

Non-competition performance: "Ngayon Ang Tagumpay" by Golden Cañedo, The Clash hosts & judges and the Top 12 Clashers

One on One - The Final Clash

Victory Song performance: "Titulo" by Jeremiah Tiangco, his first single which is released on October 15, 2020.

Elimination chart 
Color key

Notable contestants
Top 64
Rowell Quizon was the grandson of comedian Dolphy and has appeared in Philippine Idol, Pilipinas Got Talent and Tawag ng Tanghalan.
Rocelle Solquillo won TV5 Network's Rising Stars Philippines and was the five-time defending champion on the second season of It's Showtime's Tawag ng Tanghalan.
The following Top 64 clashers have recently competed on It's Showtime's Tawag ng Tanghalan:
Carl Montecido finishes in fifth place in the Top 6 of the Grand Finals on the first season.
Raychel Angkico and Aldrich Ang have competed in the Daily Elimination Round on the second season.
Aimee Buzeta, Arielle Apalis, Kristelle Atinen, Shenahia Postero and Fritzie Magpoc are regional contenders in all seasons.
Alvie Chatto was a two-time defending champion on the second quarter of the third season.
Chrisel Dela Cruz was a one-time champion in the second season.
Pamela Quidol, who lost to Krezia Mae Toñaco in Duet with Me, recently competed on Tawag ng Tanghalan.
Rovee Fernandez previously auditioned in TV5 Network's Kanta Pilipinas and appeared on Tawag ng Tanghalan.
Ian Navarro won the Duet with Me segment with Clash panelist Christian Bautista.
Diana Agustin was a member of Sarah Geronimo's team on The Voice Kids where she was eliminated in the Sing-offs. She was the defending champion in Tawag ng Tanghalan.
Allan Santarin was a member of the boy band Detour in Walang Tulugan with the Master Showman and also competed in Tawag ng Tanghalan.
GP Sorita failed to pass the final audition of the previous season. He was the daily winner on the second season of Tawag ng Tanghalan.
Ken Fraser, who won the Duet with Me segment with Jay Durias, was the two-time defending champion on the fourth quarter of the third season of Tawag ng Tanghalan.
Lloyd Sarausos, who won the Duet with Me segment with Mark Bautista, was the daily winner on the second quarter of the third season of Tawag ng Tanghalan.
Jenny Ang was the mother of Top 64 clasher Aldrich Ang who is also eliminated after her in this round.

Top 32
Chan Daniel was a member of Lea Salonga's team on The Voice Teens and was eliminated in the semi-finals.
Princess Vire, who won the Duet with Me segment with journey host Rita Daniela, previously appeared in the first season of Tawag ng Tanghalan.
Carolyn Pascual and Zaddi Ruaza are both regional contenders on It's Showtime's Tawag ng Tanghalan.
Nicole Apolinar was a member of Bamboo Mañalac's team and lost to Sassa Dagdag, who also participated in this season, at the Battle Rounds on The Voice Kids series two. She also appeared in Tawag ng Tanghalan on It's Showtime.
Bradley Holmes was part of Team apl.de.ap on the second season of The Voice of the Philippines and was eliminated on the first week of the Live shows. He recently married Niña Espinosa, a top 62 contestant from the previous season.
Rafaella Joy Berso have auditioned and failed to advance to the Top 62 in the first season.
Louise Alivio won the Duet with Me segment with season 1 winner Golden Cañedo.

Top 16
Allina Barretto was part of Team Bamboo on The Voice Kids where she was eliminated in the Battle Rounds. She was the daily winner on the second season of It's Showtime's Tawag ng Tanghalan.
Jessel Lambino appeared as a guest performer with Aicelle Santos and Clash master Julie Anne San Jose in Studio 7.

Top 12
Thea Astley won the Duet with Me segment with Clash master Julie Anne San Jose.
Sassa Dagdag finished in fourth place as a member of Team Bamboo on the second season of The Voice Kids.
Al Fritz, who won the Duet with Me segment with Aicelle Santos, previously competed in Wish 107.5's online competition Wishcovery.
Lorraine Galvez appeared in The Voice Teens as a member of Sharon Cuneta's team where she was eliminated on the first Live show. She was the daily winner on the third quarter of the third season on It's Showtime's Tawag ng Tanghalan.
Janina Gonzales was a member of the group So Wat? on Protégé: The Battle for the Big Break under mentorship by Rey Valera and are eliminated in the Top 7, tied at sixth place. She recently competed on Tawag ng Tanghalan.
Aljon Gutierrez recently competed on Tawag ng Tanghalan.
Jeniffer Maravilla, who lost the Duet with Me challenge with Hannah Precillas, was the runner-up of Kanta Pilipinas and also appeared on Tawag ng Tanghalan.
Nef Medina won the Duet with Me segment with The Dawn lead vocalist Jett Pangan and also appeared on Tawag ng Tanghalan.
Tombi Romulo was the protégé of Super Tekla who was the judge at a local singing contest where she won.
Clark Serafin, who won the Duet with Me segment with Kris Lawrence, appeared as a contestant in Wowowin.
Jeremiah Tiangco was the two-time defending champion on the second season of Tawag ng Tanghalan. He also auditioned in the previous season.
Antonette Tismo, who won the Duet with Me segment with Maricris Garcia, was the runner-up for Team Sharon on the third season of The Voice Kids.

Production

Crew 
Beginning with this season, it hired Marc Lopez as the new musical director, replacing Raul Mitra, who followed his sister-in-law and the show's original host Regine Velasquez to ABS-CBN.

References

External links
 

2019 Philippine television seasons